Neohoratia is a genus of very small freshwater snails that have an operculum, aquatic operculate gastropod mollusks in the family Hydrobiidae.

Species
Species within the genus Neohoratia include:
 Neohoratia minuta

References

 Nomenclator Zoologicus info

Hydrobiidae
Taxonomy articles created by Polbot